Several countries award a military or civil medal called Medal of Merit:

 Medal of Merit (Czech Republic)
 Medal of Merit (Denmark)
 Medal of Merit of the Dominican Woman
 Medal of Merit of the National People's Army (East Germany)
 Medal of Merit (East Timor), established in 2009
 Medal of Merit of the Autonomous Region of Madeira
 Medal of Merit (Malta)
 King's Medal of Merit, Norway
 Presidential Medal of Merit (Philippines)
 Medal of Merit for National Defence, Poland
 Medal of Merit for Blood Donation, Luxembourg
 Medal of Merit to the People (Republika Srpska)
 Medal of Merit in Labour, Spain

United States 
 Charles Dick Medal of Merit, National Guard Association
 Congressional Medal of Merit, for young Americans
 Intelligence Medal of Merit, Central Intelligence Agency
 Medal for Merit, 1939–1952
 Texas Medal of Merit, by Texas Military Forces, within the United States Armed Forces
 Washington Medal of Merit

Associations 
 Australian Medal of Merit awarded by the Australian Division of the Legion of Frontiersmen

See also 
 Gold Medal of Merit in the Fine Arts (Spain)
 Médaille militaire (France), a military decoration of the French Republic first established in 1852
 Medal for Military Merit (disambiguation)
 Order of Naval Merit (disambiguation)
 Order of merit (disambiguation)